Warri South West is a Local Government Area in Delta State, Nigeria. It was created in 1996 and has its headquarters in Ogbe-Ijoh, an Ijaw community.

Warri South-West Local Government

It is home to the Itsekiri and Ijaw ethnic groups in Delta State.

Politically, the Itsekiris currently have six wards (Aja-udaibo, Akpikpa, Madangho, Ogidigben, Orere and Ugborodo) while the Ijaws have four wards (Gbaramatu, Isaba, Ogbe-Ijoh and Oporoza).

This LGA boasts of some of the largest proven oil and gas reserves in Delta State and the Niger Delta.

Operation has commenced in the phase one the Escravos Gas to Liquid project, and in March 2015 another $16 billion gas project was commissioned. In addition, the Nigeria Maritime University is located in Okerenkoko with a take-off campus at Kurutie.

In the presence of the wealth of natural resource, the LGA has suffered huge impact of resource extraction and communal disputes but in the past years it has emerged a state place for business and development.

Warri South West is where the Escravos Gas to Liquid (EGTL) multibillion-dollar project is located. The EGTL project is owned and financed by Chevron and the Nigeria National Petroleum Corporation (NNPC). The technology and most equipment used to convert the gas to liquid at EGTL is from South Africa. The postal code of the area is 332.

Governance
Warri South-West local government is governed as a Local Government Area in Nigeria. There is a chairman, vice chairman, secretary to the Local Government and the local councillors. The current Warri South-West Local Government Chairman is Taiye Tuoyo Duke.

References

See also
Warri

Local Government Areas in Delta State
Populated coastal places in Nigeria